Hanna Folkesson (born 15 June 1988) is a Swedish footballer who plays as a midfielder for Hammarby IF and the Sweden women's national team.

Club career
Folkesson joined Umeå IK in 2013 from relegated AIK, where she had been captain.

International career
Folkesson made her debut for the senior Sweden team in a 1–1 Algarve Cup draw with China on 6 March 2013.

She suffered a knee ligament injury in training for a pre tournament friendly with Norway and was ruled out of UEFA Women's Euro 2013.

International goal

References

External links 

 
  (archive)
  (archive)
 Club profile at umeaik.se 
 

1988 births
Living people
Swedish women's footballers
Sweden women's international footballers
Damallsvenskan players
Umeå IK players
AIK Fotboll (women) players
KIF Örebro DFF players
Women's association football midfielders
Djurgårdens IF Fotboll (women) players
FC Rosengård players
Hammarby Fotboll (women) players
Sportspeople from Umeå
UEFA Women's Euro 2017 players
21st-century Swedish women